USS SC-501 was a SC-497 class submarine chaser that served in the United States Coast Guard and later the United States Navy during World War II.  She was originally laid down as PC-501 on 29 April 1941 by the Seabrook Yacht Corporation in Houston, Texas, and launched on 24 January 1942.  She was reclassified SC-501 on 8 April 1943, and acquired from the Coast Guard on 9 April 1943.  She was reclassified as Unclassified Miscellaneous Vessel IX-100 on 21 April 1943 and named Racer on 3 May 1943.  She was in service from 27 May 1943 to 21 May 1946.  She was struck from the Navy Register on 5 June 1946 and sold to the private market on 20 December 1946.

References
Motor Gunboat/Patrol Gunboat Photo Archive: SC-501

SC-497-class submarine chasers
Ships built in Houston
1942 ships
Ships of the United States Coast Guard